Skandranon Rashkae is one of the two fictional protagonists of the Mage Wars series by Mercedes Lackey and Larry Dixon and titular character of two of the three books.

He is a gryphon, an intelligent hybrid of both raptor and feline parts, a species artificially created by Urtho, the Mage of Silence.  Despite being referred to as 'the Black Gryphon', he is not naturally black, and it is stated within the novel The Black Gryphon that he in fact dyes his feathers.  During the events at the end of the book however he is bleached white by magic, leading to the title of the sequel The White Gryphon.  In the third book of the series, The Silver Gryphon, he is a secondary character.

Skandranon is portrayed as vain and publicly aloof, but also brave the point of recklessness, insisting he personally carries out dangerous missions.  He is also shown to be the closest of all the gryphons to Urtho, the creator of his species.  It is noted within the Black Gryphon that he is the only one permitted to enter Urtho's tower as he pleases.   He is also an avid reader; the character Amberdrake mentions 'Skan's cures for boredom are reading, sleeping and teasing his friends, in that order'.

In addition to being the "prime specimen of his species" he is a superb aerial warrior and Master-class mage.  His mate, Zhaneel, is said to be the first true-bred "Gryfalcon" type, but she is not the first.  While he can usually enunciate perfectly, while angered or injured his speech distinctively rolls the rs and s's so more people are likely to take notice.

In series set later but in the same world, Gryphons of that time mention that it is an honour to be treading the same ground as 'The Great Skandranon' while exploring the ruins of Urtho's tower.

References

Fantasy creatures